A white hole is a hypothetical region of spacetime which cannot be entered from the outside, although matter and light can escape from it.

White Hole may also refer to:

Arts and entertainment
 "White Hole" (Red Dwarf), an episode of the television series Red Dwarf
 White Hole (film), a 1979 Japanese experimental film by Toshio Matsu

 White Hole, a band formed by Hanno Leichtmann and Nicholas Bussmann